INS Oz is a  of the Israeli Navy. She is the second ship of her class.

Development and design 

The Sa'ar 6-class corvettes' design will be loosely based on the German , but with engineering changes to accommodate Israeli-built sensors and missiles such as the Barak 8 and the naval Iron Dome system. Elbit Systems has been awarded the contract to design and build the electronic warfare (EW) suites for the ships.

They are armed with an Oto Melara 76 mm main gun, two Typhoon Weapon Stations, 32 vertical launch cells for Barak-8 surface-to-air missiles, 40 cells for the C-Dome point defense system, 16 anti-ship missiles Gabriel V, the EL/M-2248 MF-STAR AESA radar, and two  torpedo launchers. They have hangar space and a platform able to accommodate a medium class SH-60-type helicopter.

Construction and career 
She was launched on 24 August 2019 at German Naval Yards and ThyssenKrupp in Kiel. She was handed over to Israeli Navy on 4 May 2021. In Haifa in September 2022, the vessel's 76/62 rapid-fire main gun was ceremonially accepted for her and her sister ship Magen. Later in the month a Gabriel V anti-ship missile was successfully test-fired from the corvette.

Gallery

References

2019 ships
Sa'ar 6-class corvettes